Cheeseborough is a rural locality in the Central Highlands Region, Queensland, Australia. 

Geography 
The Gregory Highway and the Central Western railway line pass through the south-west of the locality from Hibernia to the south through to Clermont to the west.

Top Knot Hill lies between the railway line and the highway in the south-west of the locality.

A small area in the north-east is within the Peak Range National Park, which extends into neighbouring Wolfang and Dysart. There is some cropping in the south-west but otherwise the predominant land use is grazing on native vegetation.

History 

References 

Central Highlands Region
Localities in Queensland